Decision Desk HQ is an American website that focuses on reporting election results in the United States. The company's president is Drew McCoy. Decision Desk HQ uses an application programming interface (API) to get election results at the same time as they are published on websites provided by election officials.

Decision Desk HQ was the first major election reporting organization to call the 2020 United States presidential election for Joe Biden.

History
Decision Desk HQ, originally named Ace of Spades Decision Desk, was founded in 2012 by Brandon Finnigan as an alternative to what he deemed "slow" election calls by the Associated Press. 

It has called major races since the 2012 United States elections, and it first became known for calling the upset defeat of House Majority Leader Eric Cantor during his reelection bid to Virginia's 7th congressional district in 2014.

In 2020, Decision Desk HQ was considered one of nine "official sources" for election results by Twitter and provided election results to The Economist, BuzzFeed, Vox and Business Insider.

Decision Desk HQ was the first major election reporting organization to call the 2020 United States presidential election for Joe Biden. The call was made shortly before 9 a.m. ET on Friday, November 6th. It made this call after projecting that Biden's lead in outstanding mail-in ballots from Pennsylvania left incumbent Donald Trump with no realistic path to win Pennsylvania and its 20 electoral votes. McCoy told Vox that the great majority of mail-in ballots from Pennsylvania were from heavily Democratic areas around Philadelphia and Pittsburgh. According to McCoy, Biden was winning the mail-in vote in those areas by a margin large enough to make his lead in the state insurmountable. By Decision Desk HQs accounting, adding Pennsylvania to Biden's total gave Biden 273 electoral votes, three over the threshold to make him president-elect. Vox, who partnered with Decision Desk HQ, called the election for Biden shortly after. Statistician Nate Silver praised Decision Desk HQs call and hoped other sources would follow suit.

During the 2022 United States elections, Decision Desk HQ provided election data to media outlet NewsNation, ultimately calling control of Congress on November 15, 2022, 6:13 pm EST, a day before other media outlets.

Decision Desk HQ News
In 2021, Decision Desk HQ announced the creation of Decision Desk HQ News and the subsequent acquisition of its first site: Elections Daily. The new undertakings are designed to expand Decision Desk HQ's local news and international elections coverage.

See also
 Decision desk

References

External links
 

2012 establishments in the United States
Aggregation websites
American political blogs
English-language websites
Internet properties established in 2012
Data journalism
American political websites